The Kodak CX4200 Digital Camera is a 2 megapixel digital camera made by the Eastman Kodak Company.
It can take photos but not videos. The camera is fixed focus, but has a macro switch which will switch to a fixed closeup focus.

External links
 KODAK Manuals and Publications for CX4200 digital camera
 CX4200 Digital Camera Software Downloads and Upgrades.

CX4200